Brian Scrivens (born 1 September 1937) is an English-born (of Welsh parents) rugby union, and professional rugby league footballer who played in the 1950s and 1960s.

Background
Brian Scrivens was born in Weston-super-Mare, Somerset, England.

Playing career

Championship appearances
Brian Scrivens played in Wigan's victory in the Championship during the 1959–60 season.

Notable tour matches
Brian Scrivens played in Newport RFC's 11-0 victory over Australia (RU) in 1957

Club career
In a "merry-go-round", in 1957 Colin Evans lost his Newport RFC Scrum-half place to Brian Scrivens, and so Evans joined Pontypool RFC, where he displaced Billy Watkins, and so Watkins joined Newport RFC, where he displaced Scrivens, a similar pattern occurred for Wales, Watkins won a cap in 1959 against France, Scrivens then displaced Watkins in the Welsh trial, but joined Wigan (RL) on the verge of a cap in October 1959, Evans displaced Watkins for cap in 1960 against England. Brian Scrivens was selected for Newport RFC in the Snelling Sevens, but following an injury in the second round, he was replaced by Clive Lewis.

Brian Scrivens made his début for Wigan in the 6-0 victory over Workington Town at Derwent Park on Saturday 12 December 1959, he scored his only try for Wigan in the 47-3 victory over Blackpool Borough at Central Park, Wigan on Saturday 19 December 1959, and he played his last match for Wigan in the 15-17 defeat by Leigh at Central Park, Wigan, on Saturday 15 October 1960.

Genealogical information
Brian Scrivens' marriage to Yvonne (née Underwood) (birth registered second ¼  in Newport) was registered during first ¼ 1960 in Newport district. They had children; Andrea J. Scrivens (birth registered during first ¼  in Wigan district), and Carl Jonathan Scrivens (birth registered during first ¼  in Wigan district).

Outside of rugby
Brian Scrivens' parents were originally from Cardiff and transferred to Newport during World War II, he attended Brynglas Secondary School, where one of his teachers was Arthur Hedley Rowland ((13 January 1919  — 30 August 2007) Newport RFC and Monmouthshire County RFC, Croix de Guerre for bravery in World War II), Scrivens was approached by St. Helens (RL) when aged both 14, and 16, he worked at Bulldog Tools, Wigan, and following retirement in September 1996 he moved to Glenridding, Cumbria, where he has been the chairman of Patterdale Parish Council.

References

External links
Search for "Scrivens" at rugbyleagueproject.org
June 2009 Gallery
Cumbria Needs Cash Injection Now, Says Penrith MP
No action against councillor who broke code of conduct
Parish council vetoes traffic lights plan
River Management Talks
Brian Scrivens' retirement from Bulldog Tools
Foremen's retirement from Bulldog Tools

1937 births
Living people
English rugby league players
English rugby union players
Footballers who switched code
Newport RFC players
Rugby league halfbacks
Rugby league players from Somerset
Rugby union players from Weston-Super-Mare
Rugby union scrum-halves
Wigan Warriors players